K&L Gates Center is a skyscraper office building located in Downtown Pittsburgh, Pennsylvania. The building (long known as One Oliver Plaza and briefly as FreeMarkets Center and later Ariba Center) was completed in 1968. The building sits at the intersection of Liberty Avenue, Sixth Avenue and Wood Street. Facing the EQT Plaza tower across the street, it shares a city block with One PNC Plaza, Two PNC Plaza and Three PNC Plaza; this "superblock" was created by the closing of part of Oliver Avenue in the late 1960s. Located across the building is Wood Street Station, a subway station on Pittsburgh's light rail network.

In 2007, the international law firm K&L Gates entered into an agreement to become the largest tenant in the building by 2010. In 2009, extensive construction began on the building lobby, the exterior facade of the first two floors and the plazas surrounding the building. The K&L Gates signage replaced Ariba at the top of the building. K&L Gates also removed a sculpture in the building's lobby in order to maintain a consistent decor. The artwork, a large enamel-on-steel mural by Virgil Cantini, has been donated to the University of Pittsburgh by the building's owner.

The lobby was reopened in February, 2010. In March 2010, K&L Gates became the building's largest tenant, having sponsored both the renaming of the building and a revitalization of the building's ground-floor lobby, exterior entry facade and adjoining plaza.

Among the building's artwork is a new, illuminated entry portal connecting the building with the street, with five "Light Columns" created by artist Cerith Wyn Evans illuminating the interior space as well as the outside plaza. These columns are complemented by the neon wall sculpture "Mobius Strip", also by Wyn Evans, at the entry reception desk. The use of light within architectural environments is a cornerstone of Wyn Evans's practice, with this site-specific piece having been created exclusively for the K&L Gates Center.

See also
List of tallest buildings in Pittsburgh

References

External links 
 

Office buildings completed in 1968
Skyscraper office buildings in Pittsburgh